Ragas and Sagas is an album by Norwegian saxophonist Jan Garbarek, featuring Ustad Fateh Ali Khan and musicians from Pakistan released on the ECM label in 1992.

Reception
The Allmusic review by Mark W. B. Allender awarded the album 4 stars stating "For aficionados of Indian or Pakistani music, this is a great recording; Garbarek's lines are right in step with the traditional styles of improvisation. Listeners unacquainted with these traditions will find this recording a mesmerizingly exotic disc. Those familiar with Garbarek's work will be very surprised. This is a unique recording for him; one can only hope that he makes further explorations in this vein"

Track listing
All compositions by Ustad Fateh Ali Khan except as indicated
 "Raga I" - 8:44 
 "Saga" (Jan Garbarek) - 5:28 
 "Raga II" - 13:08 
 "Raga III" - 11:56 
 "Raga IV" - 12:56

Personnel
Jan Garbarek - soprano saxophone, tenor saxophone
Ustad Fateh Ali Khan - voice
Ustad Shaukat Hussain - tabla
Ustad Nazim Ali Khan - sarangi
Deepika Thathaal - voice
Manu Katché - drums

References

1992 albums
ECM Records albums
Jan Garbarek albums
Albums produced by Manfred Eicher